Night Mary is a horror comic book limited series published by American company IDW Publishing in 2005, created by Rick Remender and Kieron Dwyer.

Plot
The series focused on the character of Mary Specter, a 17-year-old girl trained by her father, who owns a sleep disorder clinic, to enter the dreams of others.  The plot revolves around her interactions with the dreams of a serial killer.

Collected editions
 Night Mary (collects #1-5, 120 pages, 2006)

Film adaptation
In July 2009, Animal Logic has picked up film rights to IDW Publishing's graphic novel.

Notes

References

External links
 Night Mary #1 Review The X-Axis

Comics by Rick Remender